Colton Roche is an Ireland international rugby league footballer who last played as a  for the Newcastle Thunder in the Betfred Championship. 

He has previously played for the Huddersfield Giants in the Super League, and Oldham, Bradford Bulls, Workington Town, Featherstone Rovers, Newcastle Thunder and the York City Knights.

Background
Colton was born and brought up in Leeds, West Yorkshire, England.

He played for the Headingley Hawks junior club during his amateur days, representing Yorkshire and England Schools.

Career
Colton signed for Leeds academy in 2009 after impressing through the scholarship squad, adapting to different forward roles and used in the centre. He played for the Leeds academy until the end of the 2012 season.

He was released from Leeds to join the 2012 Championship winners Sheffield Eagles.

Colton was selected to play for Ireland in 2012, qualifying under his mother's nationality. He came off the bench against Scotland and the England Knights.

Colton Represented Ireland in the 2013 Rugby League World Cup

In 2016, he was called up to the Ireland squad for the 2017 Rugby League World Cup European Pool B qualifiers.

Bradford Bulls

2017 - 2017 Season

Roche featured in the pre-season friendlies against Huddersfield Giants and Keighley Cougars. He scored against Keighley Cougars (1 try).

Colton featured in Round 1 (Hull Kingston Rovers) to Round 10 (Halifax) then in Round 12 (Toulouse Olympique) to Round 17 (Featherstone Rovers). He played in Round 19 (Oldham) to Round 20 (Halifax) then in Round 22 (Batley Bulldogs) to Round 23 (Swinton Lions). Colton played in the Championship Shield Game 1 (Toulouse Olympique) to Game 3 (Swinton Lions) then in Game 6 (Dewsbury Rams) to Game 7 (Rochdale Hornets). He scored against London Broncos (1 try), Dewsbury Rams (1 try) and Featherstone Rovers (1 try).

At the end of the season Roche signed with Super League side Huddersfield Giants on a two-year deal.

2019 - 2019 Season

Colton re-signed with the Bulls from Huddersfield Giants on loan.

Roche featured in Round 11 (Barrow Raiders) to Round 12 (Rochdale Hornets) then in Round 14 (Halifax R.L.F.C.) to Round 16 (Batley Bulldogs). He also played in the 2019 RFL 1895 Cup in Round 2 (Barrow Raiders). Roche left the club mid-way through the season.

Statistics do not include pre-season friendlies.

References

External links
Huddersfield Giants profile
Bradford Bulls profile
SL profile

1993 births
Living people
Bradford Bulls players
Irish rugby league players
Ireland national rugby league team players
English rugby league players
Irish people of Jamaican descent
English people of Irish descent
English people of Jamaican descent
Featherstone Rovers players
Huddersfield Giants players
Newcastle Thunder players
Oldham R.L.F.C. players
Rugby league centres
Rugby league players from Leeds
Rugby league props
Rugby league second-rows
Sheffield Eagles players
Workington Town players
York City Knights players